Pataliputra, adjacent to modern-day Patna, was a city in ancient India, originally built by Magadha ruler Ajatashatru in 490 BCE as a small fort near the Ganges river. Udayin laid the foundation of the city of Pataliputra at the confluence of two rivers, the Son and the Ganges. He shifted his capital from Rajgriha to Patliputra due to the latter's central location in the empire.

It became the capital of major powers in ancient India, such as the Shishunaga Empire (c. 413–345 BCE), Nanda Empire (c. 460 or 420–325 BCE), the Maurya Empire (c. 320–180 BCE), the Gupta Empire (c. 320–550 CE), and the Pala Empire (c. 750–1200 CE). During the Maurya period (see below), it became one of the largest cities in the world. As per the Greek diplomat, traveler and historian Megasthenes, during the Mauryan Empire (c. 320–180 BCE) it was among the first cities in the world to have a highly efficient form of local self government. Afterwards, Sher Shah Suri (1538–1545) revived Pataliputra, which had been in decline since the 7th century CE, and renamed it Paṭna.

The location of the site was first identified in modern times in 1892 by Laurence Waddell, published as Discovery Of The Exact Site Of Asoka's Classic Capital. Extensive archaeological excavations have been made in the vicinity of modern Patna. Excavations early in the 20th century around Patna revealed clear evidence of large fortification walls, including reinforcing wooden trusses.

Etymology
In the Sanskrit language, "Pāṭali-" refers to the pāṭalī tree (Bignonia suaveolens), while "-putrá" (पुत्र) means "son".

One traditional etymology holds that the city was named after the plant. Indeed, according to the Mahāparinibbāṇa Sutta (Sutta 16 of the Dīgha Nikāya), Pāṭaliputta was the place "where the seedpods of the Pāṭali plant break open". This seems unlikely, as Rajah Sudarshan lived in the 19th century, some 2,500 years after the city was founded by Ajatashatru. Pataliputra was also called Kusumapura (city of flowers).

History
There is no mention of Pataliputra in written sources prior to the early Jain and Buddhist texts (the Pali Canon and Āgamas), where it appears as the village of Pataligrama and is omitted from a list of major cities in the region. Early Buddhist sources report a city being built in the vicinity of the village towards the end of the Buddha's life; this generally agrees with archaeological evidence showing urban development occurring in the area no earlier than the 3rd or 4th Century BCE. In 303 BCE, Greek historian and ambassador Megasthenes mentioned Pataliputra as a city in his work Indika.Diodorus, quoting Iambulus mention that the king of Pataliputra had a " great love for the Greeks ".

The city of Pataliputra was formed by fortification of a village by Haryanka ruler Ajatashatru, son of Bimbisara.

Its central location in north eastern India led rulers of successive dynasties to base their administrative capital here, from the Nandas, Mauryans, Shungas and the Guptas down to the Palas. Situated at the confluence of the Ganges, Gandhaka and Son rivers, Pataliputra formed a "water fort, or jaldurga". Its position helped it dominate the riverine trade of the Indo-Gangetic plains during Magadha's early imperial period. It was a great centre of trade and commerce and attracted merchants and intellectuals, such as the famed Chanakya, from all over India.

Two important early Buddhist councils are recorded in early Buddhist texts as being held here, the second session of the Second Buddhist council in the reign of Ashoka, 35 years after the first session held in Vaisali and the Third Buddhist council.

Jain and Brahmanical sources identify Udayabhadra, son of Ajatashatru, as the king who first established Pataliputra as the capital of Magadha. The Sangam Tamil epic Akanaṉūṟu mentions Nanda kings ruling Pataliputra.

Capital of the Maurya Empire

 

During the reign of Emperor Ashoka in the 3rd century BCE, it was one of the world's largest cities, with a population of about 150,000–400,000. The city is estimated to have had a surface of 25.5 square kilometers, and a circumference of 33.8 kilometers, and was in the shape of a parallelogram and had 64 gates (that is, approximately one gate every 500 meters). Pataliputra reached the pinnacle of prosperity when it was the capital of the great Mauryan Emperors, Chandragupta Maurya and Ashoka. The city prospered under the Mauryas and a Greek ambassador, Megasthenes, resided there and left a detailed account of its splendour, referring to it as "Palibothra":

Strabo in his Geographia adds that the city walls were made of wood. These are thought to be the wooden palisades identified during the excavation of Patna.

Aelian, although not expressly quoting Megasthenes nor mentioning Pataliputra, described Indian palaces as superior in splendor to Persia's Susa or Ecbatana:

Under Ashoka, most of wooden structure of Pataliputra palace may have been gradually replaced by stone. Ashoka was known to be a great builder, who may have even imported craftsmen from abroad to build royal monuments. Pataliputra palace shows decorative influences of the Achaemenid palaces and Persepolis and may have used the help of foreign craftmen. Which may be the result of the formative influence of craftsmen employed from Persia following the disintegration of the Achaemenid Empire after the conquests of Alexander the Great.

Capital of later dynasties
The city also became a flourishing Buddhist centre boasting a number of important monasteries. It remained the capital of the Gupta dynasty (3rd–6th centuries) and the Pala Dynasty (8th-12th centuries). When Faxian visited the city in 400 A.D, he found the people to be rich and prosperous; they practised virtue and justice. He found that the nobles and householders of the city had constructed several hospitals in which the poor of all countries, the destitute, the crippled and the diseased can get treatment. They could receive every kind of help gratuitously. Physicians would inspect the diseases, and order them food, drink, and medicines. The city was largely in ruins when visited by Xuanzang. In a fanciful 1559 book about world geography, the Italian Caius Julius Solinus briefly mentions a powerful Indian kingdom of Prasia with a capital at Palibotra. Afterwards, Sher Shah Suri made Pataliputra his capital and changed the name to modern Patna.

Structure

Though parts of the ancient city have been excavated, much of it still lies buried beneath modern Patna. Various locations have been excavated, including Kumhrar, Bulandi Bagh and Agam Kuan.

During the Mauryan period, the city was described as being shaped as parallelogram, approximately 2.5 kilometers (1.5 miles) wide and 15 kilometers (9 miles) long. Its wooden walls were pierced by 64 gates. Archaeological research has found remaining portions of the wooden palisade over several kilometers, but stone fortifications have not been found.

Excavated sites of Pataliputra
 Kumhrar
 Bulandi Bagh
 Agam Kuan

As dynastic capital

Main recovered artifacts

See also

 Azimabad
 Names of Patna
 History of Patna

References

Sources

Further reading

 Bernstein, Richard (2001). Ultimate Journey: Retracing the Path of an Ancient Buddhist Monk (Xuanzang) who crossed Asia in Search of Enlightenment. Alfred A. Knopf, New York. 

History of Patna
Buddhist pilgrimage sites in India
Former populated places in India
Former capital cities in India
Indo-Aryan archaeological sites
Ancient Indian cities
Maurya Empire